A bagatelle is a short literary piece in light style. Definitions of the term vary, with bagatelle referring to a variety of forms, while generally considered an unimportant or insignificant thing or trifle.

Definitions

The American Heritage® Dictionary of the English Language, 4th Edition 
 n. An unimportant or insignificant thing; a trifle.
 n. A short, light piece of verse or music.
 n. A game played on an oblong table with a cue and balls.

Wiktionary, Creative Commons Attribution/Share-Alike License 
 n. A trifle; an unsubstantial thing.
 n. A short piece of literature or of instrumental music, typically light or playful in character.
 n. A game similar to billiards played on an oblong table with pockets or arches at one end only.
 n. Any of several smaller, wooden table top games developed from the original bagatelle in which the pockets are made of pins; also called pin bagatelle, hit-a-pin bagatelle, jaw ball.

GNU version of the Collaborative International Dictionary of English 
 n. A trifle; a thing of no importance.
 n. A game played on an oblong board, having, at one end, cups or arches into or through which balls are to be driven by a rod held in the hand of the player.

The Century Dictionary and Cyclopedia 
 n. A trifle; a thing of no importance.
 n. A game played on a table having at one end nine holes, into which balls are to be struck with a billiard-cue.
 n. Specifically, in music, a short and light piece, usually for the piano.

WordNet 3.0 (2006) by Princeton University 
 n. something of little value or significance
 n. a table game in which short cues are used to knock balls into holes that are guarded by wooden pegs; penalties are incurred if the pegs are knocked over
 n. a light piece of music for piano

Etymologies 
French, from Italian bagatella, diminutive of dialectal bagata, little property, possibly from Latin bāca, berry (American Heritage® Dictionary of the English Language, Fourth Edition) From French bagatelle, from Italian bagattella. (Wiktionary)

References 

Narrative techniques